College town
University Town (Miskolc)
University Town, Peshawar
University Town of Shenzhen
University Town Center
University Town Plaza
University Town (Chashan)
University Towne Center, San Diego, California